Manep (Malas, Simbukanam) is a Papuan language of Sumgilbar Rural LLG, Madang Province, Papua New Guinea.

There are two dialects named after the villages in which they are spoken:
Malas dialect, spoken in Malas village
Simbukanam dialect, spoken in Simbukanam village

The Malas and Simbukanam dialects differ slightly from each other.

References

Dimir–Malas languages
Languages of Madang Province